Bussero is a comune (municipality) in the Province of Milan in the Italian region Lombardy, located about  northeast of Milan.

Bussero borders the following municipalities: Pessano con Bornago, Carugate, Gorgonzola, Cernusco sul Naviglio, Cassina de' Pecchi.

Villa Sioli Legnani is just outside town.

Demographic evolution

References

External links
 www.comune.bussero.mi.it/
 proloco "le ville" bussero

Cities and towns in Lombardy